Georg Baselt (23 August 1869 – 20 June 1928) was a German stage and film actor. He appeared in more than thirty films from 1915 to 1927.

Selected filmography

References

External links 

1869 births
1928 deaths
German male film actors
German male stage actors
German male silent film actors
Actors from Wrocław
19th-century German male actors
20th-century German male actors